Ziv Shilon (born May 10, 1988) is an Israeli entrepreneur, lecturer and social activist. He served as an officer in the Givati Brigade and was severely wounded on the Gaza Strip in 2012 where he lost his left hand in battle.

Biography 
Ziv Shilon was born in Beer-Sheva. His mother, Margalit, was a kindergarten teacher and educator, and his father, Zvi, was an entrepreneur and business owner in the textile industry. Shilon is the youngest of two brothers and sister. He finished high school at "Mekif Gimel" in Be'er Sheva and played basketball for the Hapoel Be'er Sheva youth group. In 2006, Shilon joined the Givati Brigade, a combat unit in the Israeli Defense Force. Shilon served in the IDF for 8 years in different roles.

On October 23, 2012, Shilon was critically injured during a military operation on the Gaza border. An explosive device that was planted on the fence severed his left hand and severely damaged his right hand. Subsequently, he underwent 17 surgical operations and 11 months of intensive rehabilitation.

Shilon was married in 2014, and lives in Herzliya with his wife and two children.

In 2018, he was awarded by Ministry of Defense with a medal for his service and rehabilitation process.

Social and business activity 
Ziv Shilon has a Bachelor of Laws diploma from IDC Herzliya's Law School. In 2014, Shilon took part of the planning team for a national day of recognition for IDF casualties along with activists from Bnei Akiva and Deputy Speaker of the Knesset, Yoni Chetboun. In January 2015, Shilon constructed a project called "Someone to Run With" in which injured fighters participated along with boys who were defined as "at-risk youth" in physical activities and extreme sports.

In March 2016, along with his fellow classmates and several senior staff members at the Interdisciplinary Center (IDC), Shilon founded the "Roots" program to help injured soldiers after rehabilitation. In April 2016, he launched the "Combat Fitness" project in the only juvenile detention facility in Israel, Ofek Prison. It was created in collaboration with the IDF Association and the prison administration. The goal of "Combat Fitness" was to facilitate the rehabilitation of adolescent boys through empowerment and connection with the IDF soldiers. They would then be provided with pre-military preparations and become members of the IDF after their release.

Business activity 
In February 2017, Shilon, along with his partners, established "OurGoods," a platform that connects manufacturers to consumers. In February 2018, Shilon was selected to be one of the Forbes 30 Under 30 list.

During 2018–2020, Shilon's contributed to the development of a Microsoft Xbox gaming remote for players with disabilities. The specialized gaming remote was presented on the "Most Respected List, within the "Ten Most Important Developments in the Last Decade" by Time Magazine. Shilon joined as a consultant and shareholder in another company targeting the operations of disabilities control, "6Degrees," in which an Israeli team develops algorithms that enable the control in smart devices without the use of touch, benefitting those affected with limited motor skills.

Other activities
In 2015, Shilon completed the 42.2 km Berlin Marathon. In November 2018, after two years of training, Shilon became one of the few athletes to successfully complete the Iron Man competition, despite the physical disability of both his hands. The competition was held in Arizona, USA, where Shilon competed unrestrictedly alongside able-bodied athletes, crossing the finish line after 13 hours.

Shilon has published content in collaboration with the newspaper, Yedioth Achronoth.

External links

References

Reichman University alumni
Israeli company founders
Israeli activists
1988 births
Living people
Businesspeople from Beersheba
Lawyers from Beersheba